Skorzeny may refer to:

 People
 Otto Skorzeny, (1908–1975), Austrian Waffen-SS officer
 Fritz Skorzeny, Austrian composer of classical music, see List of compositions for viola: S to Z

 Fictional characters
 Janos Skorzeny, the fictional vampire in Kolchak: The Night Stalker
 Janos Skorzeny, the fictional werewolf in Werewolf

See also